Cladistics is a bimonthly peer-reviewed scientific journal which has published research in cladistics since 1985. It is published by Wiley-Blackwell on behalf of the Willi Hennig Society. Cladistics publishes papers relevant to evolution, systematics, and integrative biology. Papers of both a conceptual or philosophical nature, discussions of methodology, empirical studies on taxonomic groups from animals to bacteria, and applications of systematics in disciplines such as genomics, paleontology and biomedical epidemiology are accepted. Five types of paper appear in the journal: reviews, regular papers, forum papers, letters to the editor, and book reviews. According to the Journal Citation Reports, the journal has a 2020 impact factor of 5.254, ranking it 10th out of 50 journals in the category "Evolutionary Biology". Its editor-in-chief is Rudolf Meier, who replaced Dennis Stevenson in 2019.

External links 
 
 Willi Hennig Society

Evolutionary biology journals
Phylogenetics
Bimonthly journals
English-language journals
Wiley-Blackwell academic journals
Publications established in 1985
Academic journals associated with learned and professional societies